George Thaxton Farmer (born April 19, 1948) is a former professional American football player who played wide receiver in the National Football League (NFL) for six seasons.  At UCLA, Farmer was a member of the track, football and basketball teams, including the Bruins' 1969 NCAA championship basketball team.  Farmer's son Danny also played football at UCLA and at the NFL for the Cincinnati Bengals for three seasons.

References

1948 births
Living people
American football wide receivers
American men's basketball players
Basketball players from Tennessee
Chicago Bears players
Detroit Lions players
Players of American football from Tennessee
Sportspeople from Chattanooga, Tennessee
Track and field athletes from Tennessee
UCLA Bruins football players
UCLA Bruins men's basketball players
UCLA Bruins men's track and field athletes